Erle C. Kenton (August 1, 1896 – January 28, 1980) was an American film director. Kenton was  director of B films, with his most famous film being Island of Lost Souls starring Charles Laughton.

Biography
Prior to filmwork, Kenton was a school teacher and later decided to become an animal exhibitor. After working with various dog, pony and other animal shows, he entered the vaudeville circuit as a comedian. This led to him entering the film industry working on the Keystone Cops series of films making various short comedies.

Kenton began as a writer for Mack Sennett in 1914 and would direct feature films for Columbia Pictures,  Tiffany Pictures, Paramount Pictures, RKO Pictures, Republic Pictures. He worked for Universal Pictures between 1941 to 1946 making films such as The Ghost of Frankenstein, House of Frankenstein, House of Dracula and The Cat Creeps and several films featuring comedians Abbott & Costello. Kenton was replaced by Charles Lamont on Hit the Ice after problems with Lou Costello.

Producer Paul Malvern stated later that Kenton and him "got along beautifully" and that "He was one director who thought everything out and made sure that he came in on budget and on time. He wasn't real fond of directing the Abbott and Costello films so he got a kick out of the monster films." Kenton spoke about directing horror films in a 1944 interview, stating "They give us a chance to let our imagination run wild. The art department can go to town on creep sets. Prop men have fun with cobwebs. The cameraman has fun with trick lighting and shadows. The director has fun. We have more fun making a horror picture than a comedy."

Kenton and Edward Ludwig were the principal directors of the 1958–1960 CBS television series, The Texan. Kenton died on January 28, 1980, of Parkinson's disease in Glendale, California. Malvern recalled that when he visited Kenton before his death, Kenton did not recognize him.

Selected filmography

References

Sources

External links

1896 births
1980 deaths
American male film actors
Burials at Forest Lawn Memorial Park (Glendale)
20th-century American male actors
People from Norborne, Missouri
Film directors from Missouri
Horror film directors
Neurological disease deaths in California
Deaths from Parkinson's disease